Youndouo is a town in northeastern Ivory Coast. It is a sub-prefecture of Bouna Department in Bounkani Region, Zanzan District.

Youndouo was a commune until March 2012, when it became one of 1126 communes nationwide that were abolished.

In 2014, the population of the sub-prefecture of Youndouo was 12,602.

Villages
The twelve villages of the sub-prefecture of Youndouo and their population in 2014 are:

Notes

Sub-prefectures of Bounkani
Former communes of Ivory Coast